Vernon John Lewis (22 May 1881 – 25 March 1941) was an English amateur footballer and minor counties cricketer.

Lewis was born at Woodbridge, Suffolk. He played football for Ipswich Town from 1900 to 1911, making 185 appearances and scoring six goals. This also included a spell as captain.

Lewis also played cricket at minor counties level for Suffolk from 1906–10, making sixteen appearances in the Minor Counties Championship.

References

1881 births
1941 deaths
People from Woodbridge, Suffolk
English footballers
Association football wing halves
Ipswich Town F.C. players
English cricketers
Suffolk cricketers
English Football League players